The Moskvitch-408 (also referred to as the Moskvich-408, and M-408) series is a supermini car produced by the Soviet car manufacturer MZMA/AZLK between 1964 and 1975. The first prototype was made in 1960.

The M-408, the first of the series, replaced the second generation Moskvitch 407 as the main production model; it had a longer wheelbase than the 407. Design work started in 1959, and the first prototype appeared in March 1961. The first production 408 was built 1 August 1964, and the 408 was given its official debut on October 21. First marketed body styles of the main version were a four-door saloon (base), five-door estate (the model M-426, an upgrade of second generation M-423 and M-424), and a three-door sedan delivery (the M-433, an upgrade of the second generation M-432 delivery pick-up).

The IZh-408 was a duplicate version of the car made by IZh factory in Izhevsk from 1966 to 1967. It was then replaced in production by the M-412.

In 1976, alongside the M-412, the series were succeeded by the third generation M-2140 series.

Production series
There were two distinct series of the M-408, which both used the same name. On 20 August 1966, Moskvitch produced its 100,000th M-408.

The first series of cars were produced between 1964 and 1969 in Moscow. These automobiles had vertical rear lights, two or four round headlights, a front bench seat, and a 4-speed manual transmission with column mounted gear lever.

The second series was produced between 1969 and 1976. It had the same engine and transmission as its predecessor, but an updated body fitted with rectangular headlights and horizontal rear lights, with triangular turn signal markers mounted on tailfins. Also it had separated bucket seats and the transmission used a floor-mounted gear lever.

Between 1966 and 1967, the car was also produced by the IZh military factory in the city of Izhevsk, carrying the IZh-Moskvitch-408 name — though usually called simply "IZh". This car was a rebadged version of the MZMA Moskvitch-408. It was replaced in production with the IZh-412, a copy of the M-412, starting in 1967 and up to 1976.

Development
The M-433 debuted in mid-December 1966, early models having a dividing bulkhead with a small behind the driver; later, the height was reduced so the driver could reach the cargo box. The rear door was split in two halves, top and bottom, while the solid sides were corrugated, rather than smooth as was typical in Western deliveries.

The M-426 appeared in March 1967; like the delivery version, it had stiffer rear springs.

In 1967, the M-408 models were facelifted with a different grille and logo design, also featured on the co-produced Moskvitch 412 model. Both cars shared similar exterior design, with a slightly modified interior and new engine for the M-412. In 1969, after a complete revamp of the body design occurred, the company introduced new taillights, tailfins and somewhat thicker interior dashboards. Later on, a more advanced car built on the same platform would be known as the M-2138/40. Moskvitch designed a prototype fastback convertible in March 1964, the M-408 Tourist, with aluminum body panels and vertical taillights. Only two were built.

Appearance and interior

The car had modern features for 1964: squared-off body with flat roof panel and sharp tailfins, panoramic rear window and semi-panoramic windshield. Deluxe versions had then-fashionable quad headlights and (some series) two-tone paint.
Since the layout of the first prototypes was created on the basis of the preceding M-407, the rear end design of the pre-facelift models inherited such characteristic features of the previous Moskvitch series as tailfins decorated with chrome trims, narrow taillights, a recognisable trunk handle, and a fuel tank flap in the middle, behind the number plate.

The interior featured a stylish trapezoidal instrument cluster, column-mounted gear shift lever (until 1973), effective heater and had a then-common practical artificial leather (vinyl) upholstery (colour-coded).

Technical details
The M-408 was a conventional rear-wheel drive economy car powered by a 1357 cc OHV straight-four, producing  at 4750 rpm (60.5 SAE hp). After 1967, the assembly of the engines was done by UZAM in Ufa. One two-barrel down-draft carburettor was used. The car was initially equipped with self-adjusting manual drum brakes, then from 1969 with power brakes with a hydrovacuum servo and a split circuit braking system.

This Moskvitch was the first Soviet-built car to have deliberate safety equipment (since 1969): crumple zones, a safer steering column, a soft grip steering wheel cover, soft interior parts, seat belts, a padded dashboard, and a split circuit braking system.

Sales
The car sold well in both the Soviet Union and other Eastern Bloc countries and was sold for export. In the USSR, the M-408/412 was the second best selling Moskvitch for the whole 1970s decade, bested only by its successor, the M-2140. In order to make it more competitive, the car was often upgraded during the time of its production and equipped with better gearboxes, more powerful 75 hp (SAE) motors, hydrovacuum brake boosters, etc.

Export models (408E) had quadruple headlights. The car was sold in France as the Moskvitch 1300, as the Moskvitsh Elite (408)/Elite De Luxe (408E)/Elite 1300 in Finland and as the Moskvich Carat in Norway. It was powered, since 1966 by  straight four petrol engine, producing . "More worth than its price", was its slogan for export sales. It proved a good value in Britain, Finland, and Norway, for instance, and in 1968, 55 percent of production was for export.

It was also assembled by Scaldia-Volga SA in Brussels, Belgium. In Belgium the car was sold as the Scaldia 1300/1400, although Scaldia also installed Perkins' 1.8-litre 4.108 engine in the Scaldia Diesel beginning in 1968. This model offered  SAE, but lacked the twin headlamps of the petrol-engined export 408. It offered a  top speed, not a dramatic change from the classic 408 engine, but offered better fuel economy. The 1.6-liter,  Perkins 4.99 engine was mounted between 1965 and early 1966, when it was replaced by the 1.8-liter version. This smaller engine was also mounted on the Moskvich 407.

Differences with M-412/Izh-412/Comby

The M-408 and the M-412 were produced at the same time until December 1975, when the older model was taken out of production. The M-412 was a more upmarket version, powered by a 1500 cc,  OHC slant-four engine. Introduced in 1967, the original Moskvitch 412 of 1967–1969 had a chassis and styling identical to that of the M-408 of 1964, both with two or four round headlights. .

The 1969–1976 M-408 and the M-412 also had identical bodies, and the M-412 received the same changes as the M-408 did in 1969. Again, the only differences between them were the engines (1300 and 1500 cc respectively). This can make identification difficult since there are no external differences between the two cars. Usually, first series' M-412 had a "412" or "1500" badge at the rear, opposite of the Moskvich logotype or near the logo, depending on The version. Other had an 1500 or 412 sign on the front fenders near the doors or directly on the front grill. The 412 has sometimes mistakenly been referred to as the 408-1500, however such a name never existed. Another difference was that the M-412's speedometer read up to 160 km/h while that of the 408 only reached 140 km/h. The gear lever of The first series of 412 was a column mounted type, because first M-412 series had a front bench and used the same gearbox as 408. Since late 1968, the lever was floor mounted because a newer gearbox was used to improve performances and make a better use of the new engine and bucket seats were adopted. By comparison, IZH 412 had the floor mounted gearbox and bucket seats from the very beginning of their series.

While in operation, the most notable difference between 408 and 412 is the sound of the engine, 412 being more silent and smooth than 408. Also, The exhaust pipe of 412 was slightly larger in diameter. First M-412 series, between 1967 and 1969 are a rare sight today, because they were manufactured in lower counts than M-408, and it was more expensive and barely exported as the UFA motor plant could not supply enough 412 engines. Moskvitch 408 had an oil bath air cleaner until the end of The series, even when this engine was passed to the 2138/2140 series. Moskvitch 412 had a dry type air cleaner, although first series, until late 1968 also had an oil bath air cleaner.

Also, in 1967 the "IZh-Moskvitch-412" came into production. For 1967, this car was a twin of the Moskvitch-412, built (like the IZh-Moskvitch-408 corresponding model) by the IZh military factory in Izhevsk. The Izh-412 were produced there between 1967 and 1976. Starting in 1971, a spin-off series called "Izh Comby" was developed in Izhevsk and independently exported to Moscow and the rest of the USSR. It featured a 5-door hatchback and a windowed 3-door "trip car" (based on the panel van) that were not included in the original lineup. Izh did not manufacture four headlights version, but retained the 1964 styling.

Models

 M-408: 4-door saloon (1964-1969)
 M-408B: 408 with hand controls
 M-408IE: upgraded 408 (1970-1975)
 M-408M: ambulance version of 408
 M-408P: similar to 408, but with right-hand drive
 M-408T: taxi version of 408
 M-426: 5-door estate (1966-1975)
 M-426P: similar to 426, but with right-hand drive
 M-433: 3-door van (1966-1975)
 M-433P: similar to 433, but with right-hand drive
 M-408 Tourist: experimental 2+2 2-door convertible (with removable hard top), 2 examples built in 1964; fitted with aluminium body and electronically controlled fuel injection system.

Exported cars (with an -E suffix, i.e. Since 1968 all 408 intended for export outside of the Warsaw Bloc were equipped with the 54 hp version, although in the Soviet Union and in Eastern Europe the 50 hp model was still also available. Top speed was slightly higher, 130 km/h, while the sprint from 0 – 100 km/h was slightly reduced to 27 seconds from 29 seconds.

Illustrations

See also
AZLK
Moskvitch
Moskvitch 412

References

Caregory:Cars introduced in 1964
408
Subcompact cars
Soviet automobiles
1960s cars
1970s cars